Daniel Alfredsson (born 11 December 1972) is a Swedish-Canadian former professional ice hockey player. He spent 18 seasons in the National Hockey League (NHL), primarily with the Ottawa Senators. He also briefly played for the Detroit Red Wings before his retirement in 2014.

Alfredsson was captain of the Senators, serving from 1999 to 2013. With the Senators, Alfredsson usually played on the first line, which was formerly nicknamed the "CASH" or 'Pizza' line with centre Jason Spezza and left winger Dany Heatley, before Heatley's trade to the San Jose Sharks. He had traditionally been the fourth forward on the ice in the role of pointman on Ottawa's powerplay. One of the league's top two-way players, he holds the Senators' franchise records for goals (426), assists (682) and points (1,108) with 1,178 games played. He had played for Sweden internationally 14 times, including the 2006 gold medal and 2014 silver medal-winning Olympic teams. He was the 75th player to reach 1,000 career points in the NHL, doing so after scoring three goals in a win over the Buffalo Sabres on 22 October 2010. 

Alfredsson holds an Honorary Degree from Carleton University and was inducted into the Hockey Hall of Fame in 2022.

Playing career

Ottawa Senators (1994–2013)
Drafted 133rd overall in the sixth round of the 1994 NHL Entry Draft, Alfredsson was a serendipitous pick by the Ottawa Senators. He had been overlooked by many NHL scouts, but one man in Ottawa's front office, John Ferguson, saw the potential and pushed management for his selection. Though largely unheralded entering his first NHL training camp, he would go on to win the Calder Memorial Trophy as rookie of the year in his first NHL season in 1995–96 and was the Senators' representative at the 1996 NHL All-Star Game. In 1996–97, he improved on his rookie totals and played in the All-Star Game again. He finished second in team scoring, contributing to the Senators' first modern qualification to the Stanley Cup playoffs.

Alfredsson missed the beginning of the 1997–98 season due to a contract dispute. On 24 August 1997, he demanded a trade from the Senators after the five-year contract offered to him was worth $1 million less annually than that teammate Alexei Yashin received per season. Alfredsson eventually signed a new contract on 12 October worth $14 million over four years. After missing the first five games of the season, he was greeted by a standing ovation in his first game back in Ottawa. Alfredsson would later be named the Senators' representative at the All-Star Game for the third consecutive season. During that season, Alfredsson would play in only 55 games, due to the earlier contract dispute and a late season ankle injury. The Senators qualified for the playoffs again and defeated the New Jersey Devils, but lost to the surging Washington Capitals in the second round; Alfredsson scored 7 goals in 11 playoff games.

In the 1998–99 season, Alfredsson missed 24 games due to an injury and was limited to only 11 goals. The club once again qualified for the playoffs, and Alfredsson hoped to have a good post-season, but was limited to one goal and three points in a sweep at the hands of the Buffalo Sabres. The next season, he was named captain of the Senators after Alexei Yashin was stripped of the captaincy for refusing to honour his contract. After two somewhat disappointing seasons, Alfredsson's scoring totals improved, with 21 goals and 59 points in 57 games. In the 2000 playoffs, the Senators met the Toronto Maple Leafs in the Eastern Conference Quarterfinals. The Senators would lose the inaugural "Battle of Ontario", although Alfredsson contributed three goals in the six-game series.

In 2000–01, Alexei Yashin returned to the Ottawa lineup but the team captaincy remained with Alfredsson, who would score 24 goals and 70 points in 68 games. The Senators again met the Maple Leafs in the first round of the 2001 playoffs, and Alfredsson was limited to one goal in a four-game series sweep by Toronto. In 2001–02, Alfredsson set a personal best with 37 goals and 71 points in 78 games. In the 2002 playoffs, the Senators once again met the now arch-rival Maple Leafs in the second round, where they lost in seven games. Alfredsson led the team in playoff scoring with 7 goals and 13 points in 12 games.

Alfredsson signed a new two-year contract prior to the 2002–03 season. He increased his scoring totals, finishing with 27 goals and 78 points. The club won the Presidents' Trophy that season as the NHL's top regular season team, despite the organization filing for bankruptcy protection, and qualified for the Eastern Conference Finals before losing to the eventual Stanley Cup champion New Jersey Devils. Alfredsson scored 4 goals and 8 points in 18 games.

In 2003–04, Alfredsson finished the season with 32 goals and 80 points in 78 games. The club lost in the first round of the 2004 playoffs to Toronto, and Alfredsson was limited to one goal and three points in the seven-game series. Mid-season, Alfredsson signed a new five-year contract with the Senators.

Like many NHL players, Alfredsson played for a European team during the 2004–05 NHL lockout. He returned to Sweden to play for Frölunda HC, the team he had played for prior to beginning his NHL career. He played on an all-NHL line with P. J. Axelsson and Samuel Påhlsson, helping the club win the Swedish championship. Alfredsson was a major contributor during the playoffs, scoring 12 goals and 18 points in 13 games.

On 5 October 2005, the opening night of the 2005–06 NHL season, the Senators played the Maple Leafs, with the newly acquired Dany Heatley playing on the top line with Jason Spezza and Brandon Bochenski. The Senators were down by a goal with five minutes remaining in the third period, when Alfredsson, replacing Bochenski on the top line, scored the tying goal. This line combination would remain intact and became known as the "CASH line". Later in the same game, Heatley and Alfredsson scored the first goals in a regular season NHL shootout when they scored against Maple Leafs goaltender Ed Belfour for a 3–2 victory. With Alfredsson scoring in the shootout, he became the first captain in the NHL history to do so. Alfredsson and Heatley's sticks were subsequently sent to the Hockey Hall of Fame.

Alfredsson capped off the 2005–06 regular season with a career-high 103 points (43 goals and 60 assists) tied for first on the Senators alongside Heatley. Perhaps the best game of his NHL career took place on 3 November 2005 against the longtime rival Buffalo Sabres, in which he scored a then career-high four goals and six points. After a disappointing 2006 playoffs, Alfredsson became the subject of trade rumours from the beginning of the 2006–07 season.

Because of his poor play to start the 2006–07 season, Alfredsson considered retirement in November 2006. However, after switching to using teammate Chris Kelly's used skates, his performance improved, scoring in the next four games, and ending the season with 29 goals and 58 assists. Alfredsson, notably picky about his skates, would continue to use Kelly's freshly broken-in states until the latter was traded to the Boston Bruins in 2011.

On 23 December 2006, against the Philadelphia Flyers, Alfredsson scored his 600th career point, scoring two goals and adding an assist. In the 2007 playoffs, Alfredsson was the Senators' leading scorer with 14 goals and 22 points in 20 games. His leadership and strong play helped the Senators as they advanced past the Pittsburgh Penguins, the New Jersey Devils and the Buffalo Sabres, to reach the Stanley Cup Finals for the first time in modern franchise history. He became the first European-born-and-raised captain to lead his team to the Stanley Cup finals. When presented with the Prince of Wales Trophy, he touched the trophy while posing with it, which many hockey players consider a form of bad luck.

Alfredsson was arguably Ottawa's best player in the 2007 Stanley Cup Finals, which the Senators ultimately lost to the Anaheim Ducks in a five-game series. In a controversial incident in game four, an Alfredsson slap shot hit Ducks captain Scott Niedermayer at the end of the second period, leading to speculation that Alfredsson intended to injure Niedermayer. Alfredsson dismissed the notion, saying that he had glanced up at the clock to see if he had time to move in for a better shot, and then quickly fired in the heat of an important game.

Along with the rest of the Senators, Alfredsson's 2007–08 season was marked by highs and lows. On 24 January 2008, he scored three goals and four assists in an 8–4 victory over the Tampa Bay Lightning, setting the Senators' record for most points in one game. It vaulted him into the NHL scoring lead at the All-Star break. He was named NHL Player of the Week and the week's First Star. Alfredsson and his linemates, Heatley and Spezza, were named to the Eastern Conference All-Star Game roster, although Heatley would not play due to injury. Injuries reduced Alfredsson's playing time and effectiveness in the latter half of the season. First, Alfredsson suffered a hip pointer injury, and on 3 April 2008, Mark Bell of the Maple Leafs hit him with a shoulder that left Alfredsson on the ice, unable to get up for several minutes. He missed the final game of the regular season and the beginning of the 2008 playoffs; he had played in every modern Senators playoff game up to that point. On 14 April 2008, with the Senators trailing 2–0 in their playoff series to the Pittsburgh Penguins, Alfredsson made his return in game three of the series, four weeks earlier than initially expected. He was welcomed with a lengthy standing ovation at Scotiabank Place. However, the Senators gave up four unanswered goals (three in the third period) to lose the game 4–1. The Senators lost game four 3–1. Afterwards, in an interview on CBC, he admitted that he had been playing with a ruptured medial collateral ligament (MCL).

In October 2008, Alfredsson underwent arthroscopic surgery on his right knee to remove a bone chip and returned less than a week later. On 30 October 2008, Alfredsson signed a new four-year contract with Ottawa worth  million. The contract, intended to allow Alfredsson to finish his playing career with the Senators, included a no-movement clause.

The 2008–09 season was a disappointing one for both Alfredsson and the Senators. The team failed to make the 2009 playoffs, and Alfredsson registered only 24 goals and 74 points in 79 games. On 8 July 2009, Alfredsson became the longest-serving active captain in the NHL, as former Montreal Canadiens captain Saku Koivu signed with the Anaheim Ducks and former Colorado Avalanche captain Joe Sakic announced his retirement.

The 2009–10 season saw Alfredsson's point total dip again as he scored only 20 goals and had 71 points in 70 games. On 6 April, Alfredsson reached an important milestone, playing in his 1,000th regular season NHL game. Even though the Senators lost to Pittsburgh in the first round of the 2010 playoffs, Alfredsson still scored two goals and added six assists to lead the team in scoring (tied with Matt Cullen). He later admitted that he had been bothered by a sports hernia since February, which could explain his reduced effectiveness in the last weeks of the season and the playoffs.

During the 2010–11 season, Alfredsson recorded his 1,000th career NHL point in a victory over the Buffalo Sabres on 22 October 2010.

At season's end, Alfredsson underwent back surgery and was released from hospital the same day. At a 14 June 2011 news conference introducing new Senators' head coach Paul MacLean, Alfredsson stated that the surgery went well and that he was moving around fine.

Alfredsson began the 2011–12 season healthy, but was diagnosed with a concussion for the first time in his career after receiving a blow to the head from New York Rangers forward Wojtek Wolski on 29 October 2011. He returned on 11 November after missing five games, in a game against the Buffalo Sabres. On 30 December 2011, against the Calgary Flames, Alfredsson scored his 400th career goal, the game winner in overtime. Widely assumed to be a candidate to be moved to a Stanley Cup contender at the 2012 NHL trade deadline, Ottawa's strong play resulted in Alfredsson not being placed on the trade market. "I was just really happy we didn't have to make that decision", said Alfredsson of the possibility of leaving Ottawa.

At the 2012 NHL All-Star Game held at Scotiabank Place, Alfredsson was captain of "Team Alfredsson", scoring twice within one minute and 31 seconds in a 12–9 loss to "Team Chara".

In the first round of the 2012 playoffs, Alfredsson and the Senators were eliminated by the first-place New York Rangers in seven games. Speculation was rampant during early summer of 2012 that Alfredsson would announce his retirement, but on 31 July, he confirmed that he would be returning for his 17th season with the Senators.

The lockout-shortened 2012–13 season was a successful one for Alfredsson and the Senators. The team made the 2013 playoffs despite losing several key players to injury for extended periods, and defeated the rival Montreal Canadiens in the first round. Alfredsson was third in team scoring during the regular season with 10 goals and 16 assists in 47 games, and he led the Senators in scoring through the playoffs with 4 goals and 10 points in 10 games. At season's end, there was again speculation that Alfredsson might announce his retirement. On 28 June 2013, Senators general manager Bryan Murray confirmed that he had been informed by agent J. P. Barry that Alfredsson "is committed to play next year for the Senators". While Alfredsson negotiated a new contract with Ottawa, Boston Bruins' general manager Peter Chiarelli reached out to him in an attempt to gauge his interest in signing with Boston. Chiarelli attempted to convince Alfredsson that Boston could be a good destination for an older player looking to win a Stanley Cup prior to retirement.

Detroit Red Wings (2013–2014)
On 5 July 2013, after 17 seasons with the Senators, Alfredsson signed a one-year, $5.5 million contract with the Detroit Red Wings. Alfredsson's Ottawa teammates were taken aback by the news. Alfredsson phoned Chris Phillips so that he would not hear the news at the same time as everyone else; Phillips said he was shocked. Marc Methot said many teammates were caught off guard. "We all were pretty adamant that he was going to return because he is grounded in this city (Ottawa) and so well-loved that everyone figured something would work out", said Methot. Ex-Senators' head coach Jacques Martin, at the time a hockey analyst on TVA Sports, compared Alfredsson's departure to Ray Bourque's decision to move to the Colorado Avalanche from the Boston Bruins to win a Stanley Cup. Alfredsson confirmed a day later that his decision to leave Ottawa was motivated by a desire to win a Stanley Cup prior to retirement. "I had not won a Stanley Cup and that’s a big priority for me," Alfredsson said. He later explained that his departure from Ottawa was due to a contract impasse, though Senators' general manager Bryan Murray had expected Alfredsson to remain in Ottawa. Alfredsson returned to Ottawa for the first time with the Red Wings on 1 December 2013, and was greeted with a video tribute and loud cheers from the home crowd. He also scored an empty net goal in the Red Wings victory.

The 41-year-old recorded 18 goals and 49 points during his only season with the Red Wings during the 2013–14 season. Back problems kept Alfredsson from attending training camp and starting the 2014–15 season.

On 27 November 2014, Alfredsson announced to Swedish press that he had retired as a player.

Retirement
On 4 December 2014, Alfredsson signed a one-day contract to officially retire as a member of the Ottawa Senators. Alfredsson took part in the pre-game warm-ups and took the ceremonial face-off as the Senators faced the New York Islanders, a game the Senators lost 2–1.

During Alfredsson's career with the Senators, he played in 1,178 games, had 426 goals, 682 assists and 1,108 points, all franchise records. Chris Phillips broke Alfredsson's games-played record two months later. On 29 December 2016, Alfredsson became the first player of the current Senators franchise to have his jersey number retired.

International play
Alfredsson has participated in 14 international tournaments for Sweden:
 1995 World Championships (silver medal)
 1996 World Championships
 1996 World Cup of Hockey
 1998 Winter Olympics
 1999 World Championships (bronze medal)
 2001 World Championships (bronze medal)
 2002 Winter Olympics
 2004 World Championships (silver medal)
 2004 World Cup of Hockey
 2005 World Championships
 2006 Winter Olympics (alternate captain, gold medal)
 2010 Winter Olympics (alternate captain)
 2012 World Championships (captain)
 2014 Winter Olympics (alternate captain, silver medal)

At the 2006 Olympics, Alfredsson set personal highs in goals (5), assists (5) and points (10) and played on the second line with Mats Sundin and Henrik Zetterberg. After an injury to Peter Forsberg, Alfredsson took Forsberg's spot as the alternate captain, along with Captain Sundin and defenseman Nicklas Lidström. Alfredsson was named captain of Sweden for the first time at the 2012 IIHF World Championship.

Post-playing career
After retiring as a player, Alfredsson joined the Ottawa Senators as senior advisor of hockey operations.
Alfredsson and the Senators did not agree to a new contract for the 2018 season.

Personal life
Alfredsson married long-time girlfriend Birgitta (née Backman) on 31 July 2004. They are the parents of four sons, Hugo, Loui, Fenix and William Erik. The family resides in Ottawa and Särö, Sweden. Alfredsson's parents are Hasse and Margareta Alfredsson.

Alfredsson's younger brother Henric Alfredsson played with the Ontario Hockey League's Ottawa 67's as a 19-year-old during their 1999 Memorial Cup-winning season. Henric decided to stay in Ottawa after his junior hockey career with the 67's was complete and now works for the Ottawa Police Service.

On 5 March 2015, Alfredsson was presented with the key to the city by Ottawa Deputy Mayor Bob Monette; Mayor Jim Watson was recuperating from a broken pelvis suffered in a snowmobiling accident and was unavailable. The key to the city is the city's highest honour, reserved only for the people who make the greatest impact on Ottawa residents. The honour was in recognition not only of Alfredsson's accomplishments with the Senators, but also for his off-ice leadership and advocacy with the Ottawa Senators Foundation, the Royal Ottawa Foundation for Mental Health and the Boys and Girls Club of Ottawa.

Alfredsson officially became a Canadian citizen at a special ceremony at the 2016 World Cup of Hockey on 20 September 2016.

Career statistics

Regular season and playoffs
Bold indicates led league

International

Awards

International

NHL

Outside of ice hockey
On 7 June 2016 Alfredsson received an honorary degree from Carleton University for his outstanding contributions to Canadian hockey and, in particular, his commitment to the community through philanthropic efforts that include mental health awareness and advocacy for equality of athletes, regardless of their sexual orientation. On 25 November 2016, he was awarded the Meritorious Service Cross by Governor General David Johnston.

Records and achievements

Records
 Holds the Senators record for regular season goals, assists and points.
 Holds the Senators record for highest +/- rating in a season, set in 2006–07 with +42.
 Holds the Senators record for most points in a regular season game, set in 2007–08, with 3 goals and 4 assists for 7 points.
 Holds the Senators playoff records for most games played, goals, assists and points.

Milestones
 Scored the 300th goal of his career on 10 November 2007.
 Recorded the 500th assist of his career on 24 January 2008.
 Played in his 1,000th NHL game (all with the Ottawa Senators) on 6 April 2010 against the Florida Panthers.
 Reached the 1,000-point milestone with a hat-trick against the Buffalo Sabres on 22 October 2010.
 Scored his 400th career goal in OT against the Calgary Flames on 30 December 2011.

Nominations
Finished 2nd in Lady Byng Memorial Trophy voting in 2003–04.
Finished 3rd in Selke Trophy voting as the best defensive forward in 2005–06.
Finished 4th in Lady Byng Memorial Trophy voting as the NHL's most gentlemanly player in 2005–06.
Finished in the top 3 in voting for the Bill Masterton Memorial Trophy in 2011–2012.

Other
 Scored the first shootout goal in NHL history during the 2005–06 season.
 Led the Swedish Gold Medal-winning Olympic hockey team in scoring (with 5 goals and 5 assists in 8 games played) during the 2006 Winter Olympics in Torino, Italy.
 10 April 2010 was officially declared as "Daniel Alfredsson Day" in Ottawa, in honour of his 1,000th NHL game.
 Was the first European-born and trained captain to lead his team to the Stanley Cup Finals in 2007.
 Improved his point totals for six consecutive seasons from 1998–99 to 2005–06 inclusive, a franchise record.
 Appears on the cover of the Swedish version of the EA Sports NHL 09 video game.
Won the first major award in modern Senators history when he was awarded the Calder Memorial Trophy in 1995–96.
He has played in 119 of the playoff games of the modern Senators.
He led the league in goals during the 2006–07 playoffs and tied linemates Jason Spezza and Dany Heatley with 22 points to lead the league in playoff scoring.
Daniel Alfredsson became the first player in modern Senators history to have his jersey number retired in December 2016.
He was elected to the Hockey Hall of Fame in 2022.

See also
 List of Swedes in sports
 List of NHL players with 1,000 games played
 List of NHL players with 1,000 points

Notes and references

External links
 
 Ottawa Senators.com - Career Notes
 Q & A with Alfredsson (2000)

1972 births
Living people
Calder Trophy winners
Detroit Red Wings players
Frölunda HC players
Hockey Hall of Fame inductees
Ice hockey players at the 1998 Winter Olympics
Ice hockey players at the 2002 Winter Olympics
Ice hockey players at the 2006 Winter Olympics
Ice hockey players at the 2010 Winter Olympics
Ice hockey players at the 2014 Winter Olympics
IIHF Hall of Fame inductees
King Clancy Memorial Trophy winners
Medalists at the 2006 Winter Olympics
Medalists at the 2014 Winter Olympics
National Hockey League All-Stars
National Hockey League players with retired numbers
Naturalized citizens of Canada
Olympic gold medalists for Sweden
Olympic ice hockey players of Sweden
Olympic medalists in ice hockey
Olympic silver medalists for Sweden
Ottawa Senators draft picks
Ottawa Senators players
Ice hockey people from Gothenburg
Swedish expatriate ice hockey players in Canada
Swedish expatriate ice hockey players in the United States
Swedish ice hockey right wingers